Atlantic Motor Company is a historic automobile showroom and gas station constructed in 1919 in Richmond, Virginia. The building was designed by Richmond architect Albert F. Huntt with Bascomb J. Rowlett. It was added to the National Register of Historic Places on November 16, 2005. It is located at 1840 West Broad Street.

The building was empty for two decades until being converted into retail space and offices after 2004 with the support of tax credits.

See also
National Register of Historic Places listings in Richmond, Virginia

References

Further reading
nomination form National Register of Historic Places]

Neoclassical architecture in Virginia
Commercial buildings completed in 1919
Buildings and structures in Richmond, Virginia
National Register of Historic Places in Richmond, Virginia
Gas stations on the National Register of Historic Places in Virginia
Auto dealerships on the National Register of Historic Places